Bicycle jousting is jousting while mounted on a bicycle rather than a horse.

The Black Label Bike Club organise joust in New York at locations such as Manhattan Bridge.  The events are quite boisterous as tall bicycles are used and so the jousters may fall heavily if they are knocked off.  The lances used in these events are made from pvc piping.

Bicycle jousting events are held each summer in Amsterdam in the Vondelpark.

See also
Water jousting

References

Combat sports
Cycle sport